The Head of the Family is a 1922 British silent comedy film directed by Manning Haynes and starring Johnny Butt, Cynthia Murtagh and John Ashton.

Cast
 Johnny Butt as Green  
 Cynthia Murtagh as Betty Foster  
 John Ashton as Robert Letts  
 Daisy England as Mrs. Green  
 Bertie White as Henry Whidden  
 Moore Marriott as Mate

References

Bibliography
 Murphy, Robert. Directors in British and Irish Cinema: A Reference Companion. British Film Institute, 2006.

External links

1922 films
1922 comedy films
British silent feature films
British comedy films
Films based on works by W. W. Jacobs
Films directed by H. Manning Haynes
British black-and-white films
1920s English-language films
1920s British films
Silent comedy films